The Château du Petit-Geroldseck is a ruined castle situated in the commune of Haegen in the département of Bas-Rhin in Alsace, France. It is dated to the 13th century. It has been  listed since 1898 as a monument historique by the French Ministry of Culture.

Description 
It dates from the 13th century. The ruins themselves are of limited interest, but they provide a view of the hills of Alsace.

The lower court, the keep and remnant of the corps de logis are still visible.

Access
The ruins can be reached from Saverne, on the D171 road and a forest road to Hexentisch, from where a path marked with red crossed leads to the site.

See also
List of castles in France

References

External links
 

Buildings and structures completed in the 13th century
Ruined castles in Bas-Rhin
Monuments historiques of Bas-Rhin